The Poland China is an American breed of domestic pig. It was first bred in Warren County in Ohio, in the American Midwest. Its origins lie in a small number of pigs of Chinese type bought in 1816, which were cross-bred with a variety of breeds of European origin including the Berkshire. It was bred as a lard pig, and is among the largest of all pig breeds.

It is the oldest American breed of swine.

History 

The origins of the Poland China lie in the purchase in Philadelphia in 1816 by John Wallace, a trustee of the Shaker Society of Union Village in Warren County, Ohio, of four pigs of the breed or type known as Big China; it is possible that they were in fact of the now-extinct Bedford breed. Three sows and a boar were brought to the village of Union, where Shaker farmers cross-bred them with local pigs of the types known as Russia or Byfield, both large pale-skinned pigs. Further crossing with other breeds of European origin including the British Berkshire and the Irish Grazier – a slow-growing pig with good ability to forage for itself – led to the consolidation of a type which by about 1846 was usually known as the Warren County Pig, but also as the Poland or Big China. 

The name Poland China was agreed on at a meeting of the National Swine Breeders Convention in Indianapolis in 1872; at the same meeting the convention rejected the claim of David M. Magie, a successful Poland China breeder of the Austin-Magie Farm near Oxford, Ohio, to be the creator of the breed. The first pedigree was drawn up in Blue Ball, Ohio, by W.C. Hankinson and Carl Freigau in 1876, and a herd-book was started in 1878.

The breed became widespread in the United States, and by the end of the nineteenth century was among the most numerous pig breeds in the country. Numbers fell in the twentieth century as demand for lard decreased. In 1990 the registered population was about 18000 head. In 2018 a total population of 12300 was reported.

The Poland China was reared in large numbers in Argentina, principally for export. In 1944 about 1.3 million head were slaughtered, approximately a third of total production.

In the 1920s and 1930s, agricultural reformers introduced the Poland China pig into China, with mixed success. The pigs were not adapted to the climate, and Chinese farmers were more interested in a pig's ability to produce fertilizer than its meat capacity.

Characteristics 

The Poland China usually displays the coloration of the Berkshire: solid black, with white points on the nose, tail and feet. It is a large pig, heavy-jowled, lop-eared and short-legged.

Notes

References

Butler County, Ohio
Pig breeds originating in the United States